Aleimma was governor of Martaban (Mottama), then a Lower Burma province of the Pagan Empire, from  1259 to 1285. Appointed to the office by King Narathihapate, Aleimma proved a loyal governor of the southern province until the 1280s. But when Pagan was fighting a losing war against Mongol invaders in the country's north, he like other vassal rulers in the south began planning to break away. However, the governor himself was assassinated by a local chief named Ma Gadu, who went on to declare independence from Pagan two years later.

Brief
In the late 1250s, Aleimma was an official at the court of King Narathihapate (r. 1256–1287) in Pagan (Bagan). He hailed from a line of court ministers that included the 12th century Minister Aleimma, who served at the court of King Sithu I. In early 1259, Narathihapate appointed Aleimma the younger governor of the restive province of Martaban (present-day Mon State and southern Kayin State in Myanmar). The appointment came after the Pagan army led by Minister-General Yazathingyan had put down a rebellion by the previous governor Nga Shwe.

Aleimma ruled the province on the upper Tenasserim coast without incident for the next 25 years. However, in 1284, when Pagan was faring badly against Mongol invaders, many of the vassal rulers throughout the country, including the king's own sons, began thinking about breaking away. Aleimma was no exception: he began asking his local chiefs to pledge their allegiance to him.

However, he had underestimated the ambitions of local chiefs. He apparently was not suspicious when one of the local chiefs Ma Gadu not only offered his allegiance and men but also proposed a marriage between the governor and his younger sister Hnin U Yaing, with the wedding to be held at Gadu's hometown Donwun. The chronicle Razadarit Ayedawbon suggests that Aleimma was completely smitten with U Yaing after seeing her bathe in the river near Donwun. But it was a setup—part of Gadu's plan to lure Aleimma out of Martaban, and assassinate him. Gadu, who was a former captain of the guards of King Ram Khamhaeng of Sukhothai, had decided to seize the governorship himself, and had ordered U Yaing to bathe in the river where Aleimma would see her.

While the bathing story may not be historical, Aleimma nonetheless accepted Gadu's proposal. In January 1285, the old governor with a small contingent of troops went up to Donwun, about 100km north of the city of Martaban, to consummate the alliance. On the night of the wedding,  11 January 1285, while Aleimma's guards were drunk, Gadu's men killed them, and assassinated the governor.

Aftermath
After Aleimma's death, Gadu quickly went on to seize Martaban, and consolidate his control of the Martaban province. Two years later, he had secured the support of the Siamese kingdom of Sukhothai, and declared himself king of Martaban, with the title of Wareru.

Notes

References

Bibliography
 
 
 
 
 
 
 

Pagan dynasty
1285 deaths
13th-century Burmese people